Edgar Velásquez (born 3 April 1974 in Tucupita) is a retired boxer from Venezuela. He competed in the men's light flyweight (– 48 kg) division during the early 1990s.

Velasquez is best known for having won the gold medal as an amateur in his weight category at the 1995 Pan American Games in Mar del Plata, Argentina. He made his professional debut on November 27, 1996, defeating Juanito Rubillar in the Korakuen Hall in Tokyo, Japan.

References

 

1974 births
Living people
Flyweight boxers
Boxers at the 1995 Pan American Games
Venezuelan male boxers
Pan American Games gold medalists for Venezuela
Pan American Games medalists in boxing
Medalists at the 1995 Pan American Games
People from Tucupita
20th-century Venezuelan people
21st-century Venezuelan people